Sanora Babb (April 21, 1907 – December 31, 2005) was an American novelist, poet, and literary editor.

Early life and career
Sanora Babb was born in Otoe territory in what is now Red Rock, Oklahoma; neither of her parents was of the Otoe group of Native Americans. Her father Walter was a professional gambler. He moved Sanora and her sister Dorothy to a one-room dugout on a broomcorn farm settled by her grandfather near Lamar, Colorado.

She fictionalized her experiences in her novels An Owl on Every Post and The Lost Traveler. 

She did not start attending school until she was 11, and she graduated from high school as valedictorian. She began studying at the University of Kansas but when her finances made it impossible to continue she transferred after one year to a junior college in Garden City, Kansas.

She began her career in journalism at the Garden City Herald, and several of her articles were redistributed by the Associated Press. She moved to Los Angeles in 1929 to work for the Los Angeles Times, but the newspaper retracted its initial offer following the U.S. stock market crash of 1929. She was occasionally homeless during the Depression, sleeping at times in Lafayette Park. She eventually found secretarial work with Warner Brothers and wrote scripts for radio station KFWB. She joined the John Reed Club and was a member of the U.S. Communist Party for 11 years, visiting the Soviet Union in 1936.

In 1938, she returned to California to work for the Farm Security Administration. While with the FSA, she kept detailed notes on the tent camps of the Dust Bowl migrants to California. Without her knowledge, her supervisor Tom Collins shared the notes with John Steinbeck. She turned the stories she collected into her novel, Whose Names Are Unknown. Editor Bennett Cerf planned to publish the novel with Random House, but the publication of Steinbeck's The Grapes of Wrath caused publication to be shelved in 1939. Her novel was not published until 2004.

In the early 1940s Babb was the West Coast secretary of the League of American Writers. She edited the literary magazine The Clipper and its successor The California Quarterly, helping to introduce the work of Ray Bradbury and B. Traven. At the same time she ran a Chinese restaurant owned by her future husband James Wong Howe.

During the early years of the HUAC hearings, Babb was blacklisted, and moved to Mexico City to protect Howe, who was "graylisted", from further harassment.

Babb resumed publishing books in 1958 with her novel The Lost Traveler, followed in 1970 by her memoir An Owl on Every Post. Both of those were fictionalized treatments of her early life. Babb's shelved Dust Bowl novel Whose Names Are Unknown was released by the University of Oklahoma Press in 2004.  (The town in An Owl On Every Post is Two Buttes, in Baca County, to the south of Lamar which is in Prowers County.)

Personal life 

Starting in 1932 Babb had a long friendship with writer William Saroyan that grew into an unrequited love affair on Saroyan's part. She also had an affair with Ralph Ellison between 1941 and 1943.

She met her future husband, the Chinese-American cinematographer James Wong Howe, before World War II. They traveled to Paris in 1937 to marry, but their marriage was not recognized in California because it had an anti-miscegenation law that prohibited marriage between people of different races. Howe's traditional Chinese views prevented him from cohabiting with Babb while they were legally unwed, so they maintained separate apartments in the same building. Howe's studio contract had a "morals clause" that prohibited him from publicly acknowledging their marriage as well.

They would not marry in California until 1948, after the mixed-race plaintiffs Andrea Perez and Sylvester Davis brought a lawsuit (Perez v. Sharp) that resulted in overturning the state ban. It took Howe and Babb three days to find a judge who agreed to marry them, and who reportedly remarked,  "She looks old enough. If she wants to marry a chink, that's her business."

Works

 The Lost Traveler, 1958
 An Owl on Every Post, 1970
 The Killer Instinct and Other Stories from the Great Depression, Santa Barbara, CA : Capra Press, 1987, 
 Cry of the Tinamou, 1997, Muse Ink Press (27. Juli 2021), 
 Told in the Seed, 1998, Muse Ink Press (30. Juli 2021), 
 Whose Names Are Unknown, Norman, Oklahoma: University of Oklahoma Press, 2004, 
 On the Dirty Plate Trail: Remembering the Dust Bowl Refugee Camps, 2007, Austin: University of Texas Press, 2007,

References
 

Further reading
 Joanne Dearcopp, Christine Hill Smith (Ed.): Unknown no more: recovering Sanora Babb, Norman : University of Oklahoma Press, [2021],

External links
 Sanora Babb: Stories from the American High Plains
 Sanora Babb Website
 YouTube video about Sanora Babb: The Greatest Writer You've Never Heard Of

1907 births
2005 deaths
American women poets
American women short story writers
20th-century American novelists
American women novelists
Pseudonymous women writers
University of Kansas alumni
21st-century American novelists
20th-century American women writers
21st-century American women writers
20th-century American poets
21st-century American poets
20th-century American short story writers
21st-century American short story writers
20th-century pseudonymous writers
21st-century pseudonymous writers